St Olaves was a station in St. Olaves. It was on the Great Eastern Railway between Great Yarmouth and London. It was first opened in June 1859. After just over a century it was closed in November 1959 when the connection it stood on was cut, and services transferred to another route to make roughly the same journey. Today St Olaves is most closely served by Haddiscoe railway station, which is over the two rivers which separate the two villages.

Station Today
A clear line on a map can still be seen travelling through Waveney Forest, through Wild Duck camp site and meeting with the old Belton Station. On ground, a lot of the track bank is still there, as well as a small bridge in the Forest. After that, the track would have come over a bridge (To which the piles are still in the ground).
There is a house where the platforms and bridge are called 'CuttBride Cottage'

References

External links
 St Olaves station on 1946 O. S. map

Disused railway stations in Norfolk
Former Great Eastern Railway stations
Railway stations in Great Britain opened in 1859
Railway stations in Great Britain closed in 1959
1859 establishments in England
1959 disestablishments in England